YChange were a four-piece Rap R&B group from the United Kingdom, formed in 2020. The group consisted of rapper Ashley Tragic, vocalist Eden, singer-rapper Romina, and rapper VerSay. The band was formed on English girl group Little Mix's BBC One talent competition Little Mix The Search. The band was managed by KRMB Management.

History

2020: Formation and Little Mix: The Search 
In 2020, the English band was formed on BBC One's talent competition Little Mix: The Search, following the 'Rap R&B' group auditions. After their formation the group spent time living together for 8 weeks, while competing on the show. From the submitted online auditions Little Mix picked the best rapper and R&B singers, including Ashley, Eden, Romina and VerSay. Thereafter the four all auditioned individually on the show, face to face with Little Mix as their judges. Each of them passed their audition with four yeses and met up in the band room. Once all contestants were gathered in the band room they passed to the rehearsal stage where they got evaluated once more while singing as a collective. After the four, along with other contestants made it through the evaluation they performed in front of a live stage and the final line up of the Rap R&B group was decided, consisting of Ashley, Eden, Romina and VerSay.

When all six groups were formed, the Battle of the Bands began. That's where the band announced its name "YChange" since the group is the most diverse group that was formed in the competition. After performing "West Ten" by AJ Tracey and Mabel, the group received 24 points from Jade Thirlwall, 23 points from Leigh-Anne Pinnock, 23 points from Perrie Edwards and 24 points from Jesy Nelson, with 100 points max and each girl handing out 25 points max, the group received 94% of the maximum number of points, rocketing them to the first place in the battle of the bands and enabling them to proceed to the Semi-Final.

In the Semi-Finals, after having a pep talk with Stefflon Don, the group performed "Gotta Get Thru This" by Daniel Bedingfield. They ranked 3rd place on the leaderboard with a score of 90%, receiving 23 points from Leigh-Anne, 22 points from Jade, 23 points from Jesy and 22 points from Perrie. The score allowed them to move forward to the final.

Before their first performance in the final, YChange had a personal talk with Little Mix and took advice from them. Then they performed a mashup of "All of The Lights" by Kanye West and "Never Forget You" by Zara Larsson and MNEK. Although the judges votes didn't matter in the final where only the public votes matter, Perrie and Leigh-Anne gave YChange a score of 95% for their first performance while Jade gave them a score of 94%. Their second and last performance was a stripped back cover of "Runnin' (Lose It All)" by Naughty Boy, with Romina accompanying them on the piano. For this cover they received a score of 100% from each of the girls, minus Jesy who was absent during the finals. In the leaderboard for the finals YChange were joint ranked 1st with Nostalia but lost ultimately to Since September due to the public vote.

2021-2022: New music and split 
On 20 March 2021, YChange signed a management deal with KRMB Management's Kevin Reynolds.

On 17 September 2021, YChange announced on their official platforms their collaboration with Sky News journalist and domestic abuse survivor Charlotte Bateman for a brand new campaign called "Mark My Words", including their first charity single "I'll Be There". The campaign launched alongside the song on the first October, and is a survivor led, news platform where victims of sexual assault and domestic violence can publish their experiences with police. The profits will be donated to charity One Voice Against Abuse. The music video for the song was released on 8 October.

On 10 November 2021, the group performed as an opening act for Dappy in the venue London Electric Brixton.

On 21 January 2022, YChange planned to hold their first headline show party at EartH Kitchen, London where they would celebrate the release of their second single "Turn Me On". Due to unforeseen circumstances and the uncertainty of rules surrounding Covid they decided to postpone the event to 12 February 2022. The single was released on 11 February 2022, the music video followed on 18 February 2022.

On 26 August 2022, the group released their third single "Far From Home".

On 6 November 2022, the group announced that they were splitting up to pursue individual solo careers.

Discography

Singles

Concert Tours

Opening act 

 Dappy – Duki's Playground Tour (2021)

References 

2020 establishments in England
Musical groups established in 2020
Musical groups from London
Musical quartets